Cita a ciegas (English: Blind Date) is a Mexican telenovela produced by Pedro Ortiz de Pinedo, based on the Argentine telenovela titled Ciega a citas created by Carolina Aguirre. It stars Victoria Ruffo, Arturo Peniche, Omar Fierro, Sofía Garza, and Gonzalo Peña. It premiered on 29 July 2019, and ended on 1 November 2019.

Filming began on 20 May 2019 and concluded in October 2019.

Plot 
Lucía is a vlogger whose life depends on other people's opinions, and especially that of Maura, her mother, who watches over her all day. When Lucía's sister announces her engagement, her mother begins to worry about Lucía's appearance and emotional stability, betting that she will attend the wedding alone, dressed in black and heavier than ever. Lucía will have 258 days to lose weight, change her image and find a boyfriend. The bet with her mother goes viral and throughout the story Lucía shares the events of each blind date.

Cast 
 Victoria Ruffo as Maura Fuentes de Salazar
 Arturo Peniche as Federico Salazar
 Sofía Garza as Lucía González Fuentes
 Gonzalo Peña as Marcelo Herrera Toscano
 Omar Fierro as Ángel "Angelito" González Robledo
 Sara Corrales as Ingrid
 Adrián Di Monte as Roberto "Bobby" Silva Esquivel
 Oka Giner as Marina Salazar Fuentes
 Begoña Narváez as Bere
 Luz María Jerez as Lorena
 Anahí Allué as Alondra
 Itahisa Machado as Telma
 José Manuel Lechuga as Lalo
 Magaly Boyselle as Amalia
 Luis Rodríguez as El Wero
 Carlos Hays as Espárrago
 Patricio José as Julián
 Abril Michelle as Mili
 Aidan Vallejo as Aitor
 María José Mariscal as Laura
 Lara Campos as Natalia "Naty"
 Susana Alexander as Esther
 Édgar Vivar as Homero
 Juan Ferrara as Eduardo

Recurring 
 Alicia Paola as Dora
 Denisha as Yolis
 Martín Navarrete as Aurelio
 Francisco Calvillo as Teo
 Fiona as Barbara
 Sergio Kleiner as Clemente
 Amara Villafuerte as Doctora Rosales
 Francisco Pizaña as Jorge Frutos
 Gema Garoa as Cristina
 Queta Lavat as Romina

Reception 
The telenovela premiered with a total of 2.8 million viewers During its first month it aired at 8:30pm CT. Due to low ratings and not turning out to be the success that Televisa expected, on 26 August 2019 the series moved to daytime at 2:30pm CT.

Episodes 

Notes

Awards and nominations

References

External links 
 

2019 telenovelas
2019 Mexican television series debuts
Mexican telenovelas
Televisa telenovelas
Spanish-language telenovelas
Mexican television series based on Argentine television series
Television shows set in Mexico City
2019 Mexican television series endings